The Kawasaki Ninja 650R, also called ER-6f or EХ-6, is a motorcycle for in the Ninja series from the Japanese manufacturer Kawasaki sold since 2006. The 2012 model drops the R suffix from its name. It is a middleweight, parallel-twin engined motorcycle, designed for normal use on paved roads. They have modern styling and features, with low-seating ergonomics and a low center of gravity. The engine has a 180° crankshaft, resulting in an uneven firing interval of 0° and 540°.

The 650R and its naked sibling, the ER-6n, were introduced in 2006. The naked ER-6n was not sold in North America until the 2009 model year. The motorcycle fits above the Ninja 250R and Ninja 500R models, which already existed in Kawasaki's sportbike lineup, which includes the Ninja ZX models. For 2009, Kawasaki released an updated Ninja 650R which includes new bodywork, mirrors, gauges, lighting, and a new tune on the same  engine. Along with chassis and minor tweaks, an all-new bodywork design was introduced to the 2012 Ninja 650 and ER-6n along with a new 2-piece seat assembly, 20mm wider handlebars, and a new tachometer above an LCD display that shows speed, trip meters, fuel consumption, etc. The new Ninja 650 also comes equipped with an Economical Riding Indicator which activates when the bike is consuming low amounts of fuel. For 2017 Kawasaki has updated the Ninja 650 with a new frame trellis style adding to the new lighter weight and better handling. With new sharper styling it has done away with the distinctive side mount rear shock for a more conventional one, it has also added a slipper clutch. p

Other versions 

In Europe the Ninja 650R is sold as the ER-6f ("f" denoting faired), the "naked" roadster version is sold as the ER-6n. In 2009, Kawasaki introduced the ER-6n in the USA. The ER-6f differs slightly from the Ninja 650R, as it features the passenger handlebars as standard (as does the ER-6n). In addition, the option of ABS brakes was made available for both the ER-6n and ER-6f. There is also a derivative of the ER-6 called the Versys which utilizes many of the same components.
In many European countries the 6n naked version has proven more popular than the ER-6f; however in other countries, such as Australia and India, the faired Ninja 650R has proven to be more popular than the un-faired ER-6n, becoming the most popular 'sports-tourer' in the Kawasaki lineup. Production has stopped for the ER-6n model since 2018, it has been replaced by the Z650 series.

Specifications

Performance

See also 
 Kawasaki Ninja series

References

External links 

ER-6n at Kawasaki Europe
ER-6f at Kawasaki Europe
Motorcycle Daily review of 2006 model
MotorcycleUSA.com comparison test of the 2006 model and the Suzuki SV650

Ninja 650R
Standard motorcycles
Motorcycles introduced in 2006
Motorcycles powered by straight-twin engines